Screenager, a portmanteau of screen and teenager, may refer to:

"Screenager" (song), by Muse from Origin of Symmetry
Screenagers, a documentary by Delaney Ruston

See also
Screamager, a song by Therapy? from the Shortsharpshock EP